The 2022 Judo Grand Slam Ulaanbaatar was held at the Steppe Arena in Ulaanbaatar, Mongolia, from 24 to 26 June 2022 as part of the IJF World Tour and during the 2024 Summer Olympics qualification period. After the 2022 Russian invasion of Ukraine, all of the other 31 Summer Olympic sports organizations other than the IJF have suspended Russian and Belarusian athletes from their competitions.  But IJF President Marius Vizer, a long-time close friend of Russian President Vladimir Putin, wanted instead to let Russians and Belarusians continue to compete as neutral athletes. Ukraine boycotted the event because the Russian team was allowed to compete; Russia entered 24 competitors in the competition. Allowing Russians to compete went against the recommendation  of the International Olympic Committee.

Event videos
The event aired on the IJF YouTube channel.

Medal summary

Men's events

Women's events

Medal table

Prize money
The sums written are per medalist, bringing the total prizes awarded to €154,000.

References

External links
 

2022 IJF World Tour
2022 Judo Grand Slam
IJF World Tour Ulaanbaatar
Judo
Grand Slam 2022
Judo
Judo
Judo